John Pascal Vinti (January 16, 1907, Newport, Rhode Island – September 28, 1990, Boston) was an American theoretical physicist, who published papers not only in physics, but also in mathematics and engineering. He is known for the Vinti integral.

Biography
His father, Giovanni Giuseppe Vinti (1885–1959), was born in Naples, Italy. In 1922 John P. Vinti graduated from Rogers High School in Newport, Rhode Island. At his high school graduation he was honored with a prize in scholarship and a prize in mathematics. At age 15 Vinti matriculated at Massachusetts Institute of Technology (MIT). There he graduated with a bachelor's degree in mathematics in 1927 and a Ph.D. in physics in 1932. His thesis Ph.D. thesis is entitled Variational calculation of atomic wave functions. As a postdoc he worked at the University of Pennsylvania from 1932 to 1934 on helium's absorption spectrum. He was from 1934 to 1935 an assistant at MIT, from 1936 to 1937 an instructor at Brown University, from 1937 to 1938 an assistant professor at The Citadel, and from 1939 to 1941 an instructor at Worcester Polytechnic Institute. In 1941 he joined the physics staff of the Ballistics Research Laboratory at Maryland's Aberdeen Proving Ground. There he became chief of the Interior Ballistics Theory Section and a senior physicist (as of 1945). At Aberdeen he developed a keen interest in celestial mechanics and "a close professional relationship with John von Neumann and Maria Goeppert-Mayer."

Later in his career, Vinti taught and did research at MIT as a professor in the department of aeronautics and astronautics in the 1970s and 1980s.

Lecture notes that Vinti used in a course that he taught in 1966 at the Catholic University of America and later at MIT were posthumously published in 1998 as the book Orbital and Celestial Mechanics, edited by Gim J. Der and Nino L. Bonavito. According to Der and Bonavito, Vinti's spheroidal method was "many years ahead of its time" and "predicts position and velocity vectors for satellites and ballistic missiles almost as accurately as numerical integration."

He was elected in 1936 a Fellow of the American Physical Society.

Upon his death, John P. Vinti was survived by his sisters, Helena (1908–1995) and Anna (1911–2001), and their children. His nephew Jack Edmonston was his executor and was entrusted with the publication of Orbital and Celestial Mechanics.

John P. Vinti is buried in Newton Cemetery in Newton, Massachusetts.

Selected publications
 
 
 
 
 
 
 
 
 
 
 
 
 
 
 
 
 
 
 
 
 
 
 
  1971

References

1907 births
1990 deaths
20th-century American physicists
Applied mathematicians
Ballistics experts
Mathematical physicists
PDE theorists
Theoretical physicists
Variational analysts
Massachusetts Institute of Technology alumni
Massachusetts Institute of Technology faculty
Fellows of the American Physical Society
American people of Italian descent
People from Newport, Rhode Island